Varian, Inc. was one of the largest manufacturers of scientific instruments for the scientific industry. They had offerings over a broad range of chemical analysis equipment, with a particular focus on Information Rich Detection and Vacuum technology. Varian was spun off from Varian Associates in 1999 and was purchased by Agilent Technologies in May 2010 for $1.5 billion, or $52 per share.

Varian Inc. had its corporate headquarters in Palo Alto, California, and offices in Australia, the Benelux countries, Brazil, Canada, China, Germany, France, Italy, Japan, Korea, Russia, Sweden, Taiwan, the United Kingdom, and the United States.

Manufacturing plants
Varian Inc. contained the following manufacturing plants: 
 Lake Forest, California USA 
 Palo Alto, California USA 
 Walnut Creek, California USA 
 Lexington, Massachusetts, USA
 Cary, North Carolina, USA 
 Mulgrave, Victoria Australia (the largest Varian Inc manufacturing and R&D plant) 
 Middelburg, Netherlands 
 Grenoble, France 
 Yarnton, United Kingdom 
 Church Stretton, Shropshire, United Kingdom (polymer laboratories)
 Turin, Italy

Products and services

 Chromatography, including gas chromatography, GC/MS, high performance liquid chromatography, and LC/MS.
 Spectroscopy, including UV-Vis, CD, near infrared, and FT-IR
 Inductively coupled plasma, including mass spectroscopic and atomic emission spectroscopic detection. 
 mass spectrometry, including FTMS 
 Nuclear magnetic resonance 
 Linear accelerator 
 Magnetic resonance imaging 
 X-ray Crystallography 
 Information rich detection
 Drugs of Abuse Testing 
 Dissolution Testing 
 Vacuum Pumps 
 Leak Detection 
 Turbo Pumping Systems 
 Vacuum Measurement 
 Valves and components

History
In October 1967, Techtron Pty Ltd merged with Varian Associates. Techtron is a manufacturer of Atomic Absorption Spectrometers and Spectral lamps.

In 1982 Varian transferred the Cary UV-Visible product line to Australia.

In 1997 Varian bought Chemagnetics, a Colorado-based manufacturer of solid-state NMR spectrometers.

In 2002 Varian bought Ansys Technologies, Inc., a California-based manufacturer of In-Vitro Medical Devices.

In 2004 Varian Inc bought Magnex Scientific, an Oxford-based manufacturer of high-field magnets.

In 2005 Varian bought Polymer Laboratories, a speciality polymer analysis and manufacturing company.

In 2006 Varian bought Ion Spec, an FTMS (Fourier Transform Mass Spectrometry) manufacturing company.

In 2007, Varian, Inc. bought Analogix, Inc., a company specializing in flash chromatography.

In 2008, Varian bought Oxford Diffraction, a British company specializing in X-ray diffraction equipment.

On 27 July 2009 Agilent Technologies announced it would buy Varian Inc, for $1.5 Billion.

On 14 October 2014 Agilent made the strategic decision to close its NMR business. Agilent entered the NMR business in 2010, with the acquisition of Varian.

See also
 Laboratory equipment

References

External links
Varian, Inc.
Magnex Scientific

Companies based in Palo Alto, California
Instrument-making corporations
2009 mergers and acquisitions